Hoseynabad-e Qorbani may refer to:
 Hoseynabad-e Qorbani, Galikash
 Hoseynabad-e Qorbani, Ramian